Ross Piper is a British zoologist, entomologist, and explorer.

Biography
Piper's fascination by animals began at a young age through early encounters with a violet ground beetle and the caterpillar of an elephant hawk moth. This early interest led to a degree in zoology from Bangor University and a PhD in insect ecology from the University of Leeds. Piper has travelled widely in Europe, the Americas, Africa and Southeast Asia, searching for interesting and elusive beasts. Although his focus is arthropods, the sheer diversity of animal forms and lifestyles is a continual source of fascination.

In 2015 he was awarded the Alumnus of the Year award by Bangor University and has since become a member of their alumni advisory board. He is also a student mentor for the University of Leeds and a Fellow of the Royal Geographical Society. He is currently a visiting research fellow at the University of Leeds and a visiting fellow at the University of Essex. His current projects include authoring additional books exploring insects as a source of novel pharmaceuticals and biomaterials  and planning further expeditions.

Science 
Piper's interest in communicating the staggering diversity of animals beyond vertebrates led to his latest book, Animal Earth, which has so far been translated into German and Japanese. This book explores animal diversity.

In documenting the arthropod life he finds during expeditions Piper contributes to our knowledge of these areas. In addition to these two broad areas Piper is also interested in the ecology of beetles and solitary wasps, how ecology, morphology and molecular data can be integrated to reveal the true complexity of animal diversity and the interactions between arthropod assemblages and agricultural landscapes.

Exploration 
Piper is always keen to stress how little we know about life on Earth, which is a continuing theme in his books and talks. His own contribution to addressing this is exploration, mostly in the tropics. During his time in Myanmar Piper explored and searched for insects in areas where few if any scientists had been before. Tamanthi Wildlife Reserve was one such place. The specimens from this forest have so far yielded a new genus and several new species.

Media 
Piper is enthusiastic to share his fascination for the incredible living things that surround us with anyone who will listen. In terms of TV this has led to an expedition to Myanmar (Burma) with the BBC Natural History Unit as the on-screen entomologist the product of which was broadcast as the three part series – Wild Burma: Nature’s Lost Kingdom – on BBC 2. Many of the clips from this series have become YouTube hits. Piper has also featured as a presenter/on-screen expert on the CBBC series, Wild (live and recorded segments), the Sky 1 series, Extreme Fears, Extreme Cures where he helped ten arachnophobes overcome their fear and I have recently done some filming as an on-screen expert for a World's Weirdest Events. Piper has been invited to give talks around the world, including World Minds  and EG. His work has been widely covered in the media and he has written opinion pieces for the BBC, The Conversation and Geographical. Piper is also a keen macrophotographer.

Books

References

British zoologists
British writers
Alumni of Bangor University
Alumni of the University of Leeds
Date of birth unknown
Living people
Year of birth missing (living people)